Astrothelium guianense is a species of corticolous (bark-dwelling) lichen in the family Trypetheliaceae. Found in Guyana, it was formally described as a new species in 2016 by Dutch lichenologist André Aptroot. The type specimen was collected Harrie Sipman and the author from the Pacaraima Mountains (Cuyuni-Mazaruni region), where it was found in a rainforest growing on smooth tree bark. The presence of the lichen induces the formation of galls in its host, which tends to split and deform under the thallus. No lichen products were detected in the collected specimens using thin-layer chromatography.

References

guianense
Lichen species
Lichens described in 2016
Lichens of Guyana
Taxa named by André Aptroot